Mary Margaret Whipple (born May 26, 1940) is a former Democratic member of the Senate of Virginia, representing the 31st district from 1996 - 2012.

Political career
She was the Chairman of the Senate Democratic Caucus, and she was the first woman to hold a leadership position in the Virginia General Assembly. On February 25, 2011, Whipple announced that she will not be seeking reelection. Whipple also serves as a member of the Eighth District Democratic Committee and the State Democratic Committee.

Perhaps Whipple's most notable achievement in the 2007 legislative session was inserting renewable energy portfolio requirements in legislation applicable to Virginia electric utilities. Her committee assignments in the 2010-11 legislative sessions were: Agriculture, Conservation and Natural Resources; Education and Health; Finance; Privileges and Elections; and Rules. Whipple believes Virginia's tax system is "grossly regressive" and has sponsored bills to change it. Her bills would share state income tax revenues with localities and would increase the cigarette tax to 60 cents per pack. In 2001-02, Whipple served on the Commission on the Structure of Virginia's State and Local Tax System and Service Responsibilities.

In December 2009, while serving in the Senate of Virginia of the Virginia General Assembly Whipple wrote the Governor Tim Kaine, requesting a conditional pardon and clemency for Joseph Giarratano.

Whipple was raised in College Station, Texas and attended Rice University. She holds a B.A. in English from American University and an M.A. in American Studies from George Washington University. She was appointed to the Arlington School Board in 1976 and served as Chair in 1978-79. Whipple was elected to the Arlington County Board in 1983-95, and was Chair in 1986. While on the County Board, she served as the Arlington representative to the Washington Metropolitan Area Transit Authority ("Metro") Board in 1985 and in 1988-1995, serving as chair in 1990.

Among the possible successors in the 31st Senate District were Delegates Patrick Hope and Robert Brink, former Lieutenant Governor candidate Mike Signer, County Board member Barbara Favola, and lawyer Jaime Areizaga. Barbara Favola eventually won the seat.

References

Sources

External links
Project Vote Smart - Senator Mary Margaret Whipple (VA) profile
Follow the Money - Mary Margaret Whipple
2005 2003 2001 1999 campaign contributions
Washington Post - Senate District 31 Race

1940 births
Living people
People from Watseka, Illinois
People from College Station, Texas
American Presbyterians
Democratic Party Virginia state senators
County supervisors in Virginia
Rice University alumni
American University alumni
Columbian College of Arts and Sciences alumni
Women state legislators in Virginia
People from Arlington County, Virginia
20th-century American politicians
20th-century American women politicians
21st-century American politicians
21st-century American women politicians